William John Fennell  (20 January 1920 – 9 September 1992) was an Australian radio, television (serials and mini-series), stage and film actor, comedian, producer, radio scriptwriter and writer who appeared in many Australian television series in a lengthy career spanning over 50 years, recognised by his slightly nasal, raspy voice, moustache and pork pie hat. As a comedian, his style was stated as a sad humour worth more than a belly-laugh and said to be contrasted with the blue comedy of contemporary performer Roy Rene.

He appeared in numerous films, TV movies, miniseries and series, but is probably best known for his longer running roles in The Young Doctors as Arthur Simmonds and Sons and Daughters as Spider Webb.

Biography

Early life
Fennell was born to William Hugh Fennell, a vocational trainer, and his wife Alma Doris (née Tie). After finding employment as a travelling salesman, he pursued interests in scriptwriting, tap dancing, radio entertaining and comedy theatre, before World War II beckoned, he served with Citizen Military Forces and then the Australian Imperial Force. After being promoted to sergeant he was discharged, on 28 April 1944, taking a position with the Department of Civil Aviation Civil Aviation Force. He started appearing in theatre roles from 1947.

Writing career/stage and radio
He became interested in scriptwriting and wrote a radio program based on the comic strip characters Blondie and Dagwood. As character Phooey Fennell, a BBC race caller he started appearing on radio programs and scripted and starred in the popular radio series Life With Dexter during the 1950s and 1960s, which ran for more than 500 episodes and was also sold to New Zealand and South Africa radio, and also wrote a series of books collecting the scripts of the radio show including Life with Dexter, Dexter Loses His Head, Dexter Sings, More Life with Dexter, My Third Life with Dexter, The Desert Island Wreckers, Dexter's Court, Dexter's Fit, Dexter Gets the Point, Car-razy Life with Dexter, Dexter and Ashleigh Muddle On and Dexter Detects. Fennell also wrote a book of poetry and humorous sketches entitled Mad Stuff. After the advent of television to Australia, he became a notable character actor, appearing in numerous stage productions, most notably Alan Seymour's The One Day of the Year.

Film and television credits
Film roles included Cathy's Child, Hoodwink and the mini-series A Fortunate Life. On television, he was well known for roles in the 1970s and 1980s, including Jeremiah Quizzel in The Lost Islands, Arthur Simmonds on a recurring basis in The Young Doctors from 1976 to 1978, and Sons and Daughters as Spider Webb in the mid-1980s. He regularly appeared in A Country Practice in various roles, most especially as Skeeter Martin. He appeared in G.P., Chopper Squad, The Flying Doctors and Mother and Son.

Fennell was awarded the Medal of the Order of Australia (OAM) in 1991 for "service to the entertainment industry".

Actor Geoffrey Rush praised Fennell as an early influence.

Personal life
On 30 November 1946 Fennell married Joy Therese Hawkins, divorcing her in 1975. He was the father of Susan Fennell and Jane Fennell, best known as "Miss Jane" on the Australian children's television show Mr. Squiggle.

Filmography

References

External links

1920 births
1992 deaths
Australian male radio actors
Australian male stage actors
Australian male television actors
Australian male film actors
20th-century Australian male actors
Australian Army personnel of World War II
Australian Army soldiers
3AW presenters